Dallas Asberry, better known by his stage name Teejayx6, is an American rapper. Emerging from the Detroit scene in the late 2010's, he made a name for himself for rapping about scamming, identity theft and credit card fraud with the song "Dark Web" released in 2019. He is called the originator of this subgenre, calling it "scam rap." He is also known for collaborating with fellow Detroit rapper Kasher Quon with their "Dynamic Duo" series.

Career 
On June 13, 2019, he released his debut album Under Pressure. On August 13, 2019, he released the video for the single "Swipe Story" after he staged an arrest by the United States Marshals Service for a promotional stunt during a show in Los Angeles, and later staging his "release".

In June 2020, he released "Black Lives Matter," hiring producer TM88 and speaks about the Black Lives Matter movement and how he feels as a Black man in America. The song pays tribute to George Floyd as well.

On December 13, 2019, he released Black Air Force Activity 1, which included the single "Dark Web." In February 2020, he released the single "On Tour" a song written on an airplane while on tour.

In August 2020, he collaborated with NLE Choppa with the single "Punchin." That same month, he released Black Air Force Activity: The Reload. That same month, he released "Blackmail"In October, he released the album Spooky, which included the song "Stimulus Package" with Kasher Quon, BandGang Lonnie Bands, Boldy James and Alchemist.

Discography

Albums

References 

American rappers
Living people
Rappers from Detroit
Year of birth missing (living people)